The Crucible Theatre (often referred to simply as "The Crucible") is a theatre in Sheffield, South Yorkshire, England which opened in 1971. Although it hosts regular theatrical performances, it is best known for hosting professional snooker's most prestigious tournament, the World Snooker Championship, which has been held annually at the venue since 1977. Its name is a reference to the local steel industry. In May 2022 plans were unveiled to build a new 3,000-seater venue nearby with a bridge connecting the two buildings.

History

The Crucible Theatre was built by M J Gleeson and opened in 1971. It replaced the Sheffield Repertory Theatre in Townhead Street. In 1967 Colin George, the founding artistic director of the Crucible, recommended a thrust stage for Sheffield, inspired by theatres created by Sir Tyrone Guthrie. Tanya Moiseiwitsch, who had been involved in designing Guthrie's theatres, was recruited to design Gleeson's theatre as well. The architects Renton Howard Wood Levin Architects were employed and the building itself began to take shape in 1969. It was completed in two years, with the opening performance in November 1971. The opening night performances were Fanfare, an evening's entertainment showing children acting in an improvised scene, Anton Chekhov's Swansong with Ian McKellen and Edward Petherbridge, and a music hall finale with a Sheffield brass band.

This demonstrated the versatility of the stage, which has since been adapted for dance and musical performances, as well as classical and modern theatre. The Crucible Theatre also hosts touring productions and the World Snooker Championship.

The audience sits on three sides but no member is more than 22 yards (20 metres) from the performer. Consequently, although it seats 980 people the spectator has an intimate relationship with the activity on stage. Colin George and the administrator David Brayshaw persuaded the Gulbenkian Foundation to finance the building of a professional studio theatre – the 400 seat Tanya Moiseiwitsch Playhouse, which opened with the main house.

In 2001, the Crucible was awarded the Barclays 'Theatre of the Year Award'. It is a Grade II listed building.

The building went through a £15 million refurbishment between 2007 and late 2009 – opening during that period only for the 2008 and 2009 World Snooker Championships.

The Crucible reopened as a theatre on 11 February 2010 with a production of Henrik Ibsen's An Enemy of the People, with the official reopening by the Prince Edward, Earl of Wessex on 18 February 2010.

In May 2022 plans were unveiled for a new World Snooker Championship venue that would be attached to the existing Crucible Theatre building via a bridge. The new venue is to host up to 3,000 spectators. Snooker promoter, Barry Hearn, had confirmed talks were underway with Sheffield Council in April 2022. Hearn added that the tournament could move elsewhere if the new project is not supported but, “the Crucible name is synonymous with snooker globally... so the name has to remain.” The new building has been designed by the architect James Burland, the architect behind the City of Manchester Stadium, along with Arup. The building will also house a snooker museum.

Theatre
Under the distinguished leadership of a succession of artistic directors, The Crucible is a producing theatre, meaning shows are designed and rehearsed in-house. Productions are normally overseen by the Sheffield Theatres Group which also comprises the smaller Playhouse, housed in the same complex, and the large capacity neighbouring receiving venue the Lyceum.

Sports venue

 

The World Snooker Championship tournament has been played annually at the Crucible since 1977, and the venue has been lauded for creating a special feeling of excitement around the event. Sports journalist Peter Mason, in The Guardian, has argued that while the physical aspects of the Crucible are "greatly underwhelming", there is an undeniably special atmosphere inside the auditorium which means that "against all the modernist odds this relentlessly forward-looking theatre appears to have become infused with memories of the past every bit as easily as if it were a creaking old music hall dating back to the 19th century".

The Ladies World Snooker Championship was also held at the Crucible between 1998 and 2003 but was eventually withdrawn due to financial difficulties. The venue has also hosted championships of other indoor sports, such as table tennis and squash.

See also
 Listed buildings in Sheffield

References

Bibliography
Stirring Up Sheffield - an insider's account of the battle to build the Crucible Theatre, Colin George & Tedd George, Wordville (2021), ISBN 978-1-8384036-2-1
Crucible Theatre, Sheffield: A Model Theatre in the Tradition of the Juvenile Drama, Michael D Everett, MDE Pubns (1981), 
The acoustical design and performance of the Sheffield Crucible Theatre, D. J. Oldham, Dept. of Building Science, Faculty of Architectural Studies, University of Sheffield (1973),

External links

Sheffield Theatres
Guardian Unlimited
History of Sheffield's Theatres – Past and Present

Theatres completed in 1971
Sports venues in Sheffield
Snooker in England
Snooker venues
Theatres in Sheffield
Grade II listed buildings in Sheffield
World Snooker Championships